Joaquin Abarca (1780, Huesca - 1844) Spanish prelate. Born in Aragon in 1780 he went on to become Bishop of León in 1824.

During the 1833 civil war he was one of the leaders of the Carlist party.

References

1780 births
1844 deaths
People from Huesca
Bishops of León
Carlists
Spanish politicians
19th-century Roman Catholic bishops in Spain